Alfonsas Žalys (October 5, 1929 – December 12, 2006) was a Lithuanian politician.  In 1990 he was among those who signed the Act of the Re-Establishment of the State of Lithuania.

References

1929 births
2006 deaths
Lithuanian politicians
Recipients of the Order of the Lithuanian Grand Duke Gediminas